A twin tail is a specific type of vertical stabilizer arrangement found on the empennage of  some aircraft. Two vertical stabilizers—often smaller on their own than a single conventional tail would be—are mounted at the outside of the aircraft's horizontal stabilizer. This arrangement is also known as an H-tail, as it resembles a capital "H" when viewed from the rear. The twin tail was used on a wide variety of World War II multi-engine designs that saw mass production, especially on the American B-24 Liberator and B-25 Mitchell bombers, the British Avro Lancaster and Handley Page Halifax heavy bombers, and the Soviet Union's Petlyakov Pe-2 attack bomber. 

Variations on the twin tail include the triple tail, twin boom tail and double tail.

Design

 

Separating the control surfaces allows for additional rudder area or vertical surface without requiring a massive single tail. On multi-engine propeller designs twin fin and rudders operating in the propeller slipstream give greater rudder authority and improved control at low airspeeds, and when taxiing. A twin tail can also simplify hangar requirements, give dorsal gunners enhanced firing area, and in some cases reduce the aircraft's weight. It also affords a degree of redundancy: if one tail is damaged, the other may remain functional.

Most often, the twin vertical surfaces are attached to the ends of the horizontal stabilizer, but a few aircraft, like the Armstrong Whitworth Whitley, Mitsubishi G3M and Dornier Do 19 bombers, had their twin vertical surfaces mounted to the upper surface of the fixed stabilizer instead, at some distance inwards from the horizontal stabilizer's tips.

Variations
Many canard aircraft designs incorporate twin tails on the tips of the main wing. Very occasionally, three or more tails are used, as on the Breguet Deux-Ponts, Lockheed Constellation and Boeing 314 Clipper. A very unusual design can be seen on the E-2 Hawkeye, which has two additional vertical tails fixed to the horizontal stabilizer between the normal vertical twin-tail surfaces. This arrangement was chosen for the stringent size limitations of carrier-based aircraft.

A special case of twin tail is the twin-boom tail or double tail, where the aft airframe consists of two separate fuselages, "tail booms", which each have a rudder but are usually connected by a single horizontal stabilizer. Examples of this construction are the twin-engined Lockheed P-38 Lightning; Northrop P-61 Black Widow; Focke-Wulf Fw 189; the single jet-engined de Havilland Vampire; cargo-carrying Fairchild C-119 Flying Boxcar and the little known Transavia PL-12 Airtruk.

Notable twin-tail aircraft

Significant aircraft with twin tails include the Consolidated B-24 Liberator, Handley Page Halifax, Avro Lancaster, and P-38 Lightning. The arrangement is not limited to World War II-era aircraft, however. Many fighter aircraft, like the Grumman F-14 Tomcat, McDonnell Douglas F-15 Eagle, Sukhoi Su-27, MiG-29, and Fairchild Republic A-10 Thunderbolt II, make use of twin tail configurations, as do civilian and cargo designs like the Antonov An-14, Antonov An-22, Antonov An-28, Antonov An-38, Antonov An-225, Beechcraft 18, Beriev Be-12, ERCO Ercoupe, Short 330, Rutan Long-EZ and SpaceShipOne.

See also
 Cruciform tail
 Pelikan tail
 T-tail
 V-tail

References

Aircraft tail configurations